Mia Schaikewitz (born May 23, 1978) is an American TV personality and spokesperson for disability advocacy. She starred in the 2012 reality series Push Girls on the Sundance Channel.

Early life and career
A competitive swimmer at the time, Schaikewitz became paralyzed from the waist down "over the course of a half-day" after an arteriovenous malformation (AVM) ruptured in her spinal cord when she was 15. She went on to graduate with a degree from the University of Florida and then moved to Los Angeles where she developed a career in graphic design and branding. In 2012, she decided to return to the sport of competitive swimming after 17 years, as documented in Season 1 of the show Push Girls.

Awards and nominations
 In 2013, Push Girls won the Critics' Choice Best Reality Series award.

References

External links

 Mia Schaikewitz on Twitter

Living people
American people with disabilities
American film actresses
American television actresses
Jewish American actresses
Participants in American reality television series
People with paraplegia
21st-century American actresses
1978 births
University of Florida alumni
Actors with disabilities
21st-century American Jews